These are the songs that reached number one on the Top 100 Best Sellers chart in 1964 as published by Cash Box magazine.

See also
1964 in music
List of Hot 100 number-one singles of 1964 (U.S.)

References
https://web.archive.org/web/20101121003531/http://cashboxmagazine.com/archives/60s_files/1964.html

1964
1964 record charts
1964 in American music